Shivnarayanpur is a village in the Kahalgaon block and under pirpainti vidhansabha seat of Bhagalpur district of Bihar, India. It is one of the two villages credited as a single census town Madhura Siwanpur, the other being Mathurapur. As of 2001, the total population was 1054.

History
Traditionally, the village is known as Mathurapur. The name Shivnarayanpur came after the name of late Shivnarayan Ram who donated his land for Shivanarayanpur railway station and Shivnarayanpur hattya. It is also one of the biggest and oldest mandis for agriculture produce (mainly vegetables, pulses and jaggery) in Bihar. Vikramshila University is situated near Shivnarayanpur which is a National heritage maintained by Archeological Survey of India. The Ganga ghat known as Bateishwernath is also situated near this village.

Transport
Shivanarayanpur railway station is situated on Sahibganj Loop line under the Malda railway division.

References

 Villages in Bhagalpur district